Huisinish or Hushinish (Scottish Gaelic Hùisinis) is a remote place on the west coast of Harris in the Outer Hebrides of Scotland. It lies at the end of a  single-track B road. The settlement of only four houses overlooking a white sand beach with views to the Atlantic. Nearby, and to the north, lies the uninhabited island of Scarp, the location of an experimental rocket postal service in the 1930s.

Hushinish is the terminus of an infrequent bus service from Tarbert, Harris.

The name Hushinish is derived from Old Norse and means "house headland".

Notes

Villages in Harris, Outer Hebrides